Revol Porcelaine S.A. was founded in 1768 by brothers Joseph-Marie and François Revol in France's Rhone Valley, where they discovered a deposit of white kaolin.  They established a factory in Ponsas and began manufacturing a hard-wearing white stoneware, later establishing operations in Saint-Uze.  Revol later developed a porcelain body that forms the basis for Revol ceramic products, called "culinary porcelain" (la porcelaine culinaire) by the company.

Present-day

Revol Porcelaine remains a family-run company after 9 generations, with Olivier Passot as the Managing Director.  The company is headquartered in Saint-Uze, France, where it employs 185 people and maintains 16,500 sq. m. of factory space.  The facility produces 4 million units a year, exporting to 80 countries.

Revol porcelain for the hotel and restaurant industry and retail is distributed in the United States by Revol USA.

References

Ceramics manufacturers of France
Manufacturing companies established in 1768
Henokiens companies
1768 establishments in France
Companies based in Auvergne-Rhône-Alpes
French companies established in 1768